This is a list of cities and towns in Australia, New Zealand and elsewhere in Oceania that have, or once had, town tramway (urban tramway, or streetcar) systems as part of their public transport system.

Australia (by state)

Australian Capital Territory

New South Wales

Queensland

South Australia

Tasmania

Victoria

Western Australia

Fiji

New Zealand

North Island

South Island

United States (by state )

Hawaii

See List of town tramway systems in the United States (Hawaii section)

See also

 List of town tramway systems in Africa
 List of town tramway systems in Asia
 List of town tramway systems in Central America
 List of town tramway systems in North America
 List of town tramway systems in South America
 List of town tramway systems
 List of light-rail transit systems
 List of rapid transit systems
 List of trolleybus systems

References

Books, Periodicals and External Links

Town
 
Tram transport-related lists